Who Wants to Be a Millionaire? (abbreviated as WW2BAM, informally called as Milyonaryo) is a Philippine game show based on the original British format of Who Wants to Be a Millionaire?. The main goal of the game is to win 2 million Philippine pesos (earlier 1 million) by answering 12 multiple-choice (previously 15) questions correctly. If an incorrect answer is given, the contestant will leave with the guaranteed amount in the last safe haven they have correctly answered. However, a contestant may opt not to answer a question and walk away with their full winnings. Contestants are given various "lifelines" to help them answer the questions.

The show first aired from November 13, 2000, until December 14, 2002, on the government-sequestered channel IBC. It was produced by Viva Television and hosted by actor Christopher de Leon. This incarnation of the show ran until December 14, 2002.

On May 23, 2009, the game show was revived by TV5, with actor-host-comedian Vic Sotto as the new host. The show ran until November 22, 2015.

History

2000–2002: Viva/IBC Version
The first version of the show was hosted by the actor Christopher de Leon. The first season of the original Millionaire, which began on November 13, 2000, had its 15th question prize of ₱1,000,000. In 2001, the final question's prize was doubled to ₱2,000,000.

The show lost its popularity soon after its studio, the Viva Television Studio in Parañaque, was destroyed by a fire due to faulty wiring on April 4, 2002, and the show moved to Riverbanks Center in Marikina. The final episode of this incarnation aired on December 14, 2002.

The show was featured in the 2002 film Mahal Kita, Final Answer, produced by Viva Films, with de Leon on a cameo role.

2009–2015: TV5 Version

In April 2009, promotional videos and content about the comeback of Who Wants to Be a Millionaire? started airing on TV5. Vic Sotto was announced as the host of the show.

The revival began airing on May 23, 2009. Following the network move, the show was taped in a new set in the TV5 Studio and used the updated graphics, title sequence, and music from the 22nd series of the original UK version. It premiered as a celebrity special, featuring 10 celebrities as contestants in the Fastest Finger First—Ara Mina, Mo Twister, Manilyn Reynes, Polo Ravales, Megan Young, Jay Manalo, Nadia Montenegro, Rafael Rosell, Gladys Reyes, and Assunta De Rossi.

The Fastest Finger Finger round which determined the contestant who be playing was removed in favor of auditioning through text entry and mall shows starting season 6. Producers now have a predetermined list of contestants from the auditions.

This incarnation of the show featured different money tree and lifeline formats. The last episode was aired on November 22, 2015.

Top prize winners
Throughout the original run on IBC, no contestant completed the game by answering all fifteen questions correctly. There were two contestants who came the closest—De La Salle University associate professor Amelita Lopez-Forbes, and actress Sharon Cuneta on December 25—who each answered 14 questions correctly and won a million pesos in 2001.

In the TV5 incarnation, there were 3 contestants who have won the top prize.

Sharon Cuneta (January 9, 2010)

Sharon Cuneta had previously played in the IBC version of Millionaire and walked away at question 15 with ₱1,000,000, splitting her winnings equally in thirds—for the San Lorenzo Ruiz Formation and Learning Center, for the Chosen Children Foundation, and for the sick daughter of her colleague.

On January 9, 2010, three days after her birthday, Cuneta once again played on the show and won ₱2,000,000, making her the first top prize winner in the Philippine franchise's history. All of the money she won was donated to the Hospicio de San Jose. Coincidentally, the 13th question in her game was about the name of the island where the orphanage is located, Isla de Convalecencia. The final question was about William Shakespeare's work, Macbeth.

Karl Jonathan Aguilar (September 18, 2011)

On September 18, 2011, the Philippine version gained its second top prize winner: IT specialist Karl Jonathan Aguilar. The final question was about the name of the Index Librorum Prohibitorum. He did not use his lifelines up to the 13th question worth ₱600,000. When his last lifeline, Phone-A-Friend, was used during the final question; his friend suggested one of the wrong answers.

Eduardo Gaeilo Pajinag, Jr. (October 20, 2013)

The third top-prize winner was IT auditor Eduardo "Gaeilo" Pajinag, Jr. on October 20, 2013. He said that he auditioned seven times unsuccessfully before being accepted. He was the first winner of the new money tree, the High-Risk money tree. The final question was about Jabberwocky, the nonsense poem written by Lewis Carroll. The other options were synonyms of "nonsense". After considering where the dance group Jabbawockeez got their name, he answered correctly to win the ₱2 million peso top-prize.

Format

Game rules

The 10 contestants who have passed the auditions play in the preliminary round called "Fastest Finger First". Contestants must arrange the four answers in the correct order stated within the question (i.e. alphabetically, chronologically). The contestant who answers the question correctly and in the fastest time plays the main game. In the event that nobody answered the question correctly, a new question is asked. If two or more contestants gave the correct order at the same time, there is a tiebreaker question between the contestants to determine who advances to the main game.

After completing Fastest Finger First, the contestant begins the main game where he/she must answer a series of increasingly difficult questions. The questions are valued at progressively higher sums of money, up to the top prize of ₱2,000,000 (₱1,000,000 in 2000). The 15 questions are randomly chosen by the computer from a list of pre-generated questions based on general knowledge. For each question, there are four options labelled from A to D. During the game, contestants are given three lifelines to help them with a question at any time. There are two safe havens at questions 5 and 10. If a contestant answers a question incorrectly but has passed a safe haven, they leave with the safe haven amount. If a contestant is unsure about a question, they may walk away and leave with the amount they have already banked. To confirm that their answer is final, the host asks "Is that your final answer?". Upon saying "final answer" together with the selected option, their answer is deemed final and cannot be changed. The host is not shown the correct answer on his monitor until a contestant has said "final answer". If the episode has reached the end of its allotted time, a klaxon is cued to highlight this. Contestants who are still playing the main game would return in the next episode to continue their game.

Over the course of the show's run, the format of Millionaire was changed in a number of aspects, mainly relating to the setup of questions and the payout structure used in the game, along with minor tweaks and changes in other aspects:
 In 2000, contestants had to answer fifteen questions, with two safe havens at ₱10,000 and ₱100,000, and could use the 50:50, Phone-A-Friend and Ask the Audience lifelines at any time within the game.
 The following year, the ₱400,000 question was removed. ₱500,000 and ₱1,000,000 became the 13th and 14th question values, respectively. The top prize was increased to ₱2,000,000.
 The TV5 version launched with a new money tree with modified cash values, but still with a top prize of ₱2,000,000. The safe havens were ₱20,000 and ₱150,000. The same 3 lifelines were offered.
 In the 6th season, the Ask the Audience was replaced with People Speak. Switch was also introduced as a fourth lifeline in the 6th season. It was available only after passing the second safe haven. Additionally, the Fastest Finger Finger round was removed in favor of auditioning through text entry and mall shows. Producers now have a predetermined list of contestants from the auditions.
 In the 10th season, Phone-A-Friend was removed. Instead, Switch was available from the beginning of the game. A new format was also introduced where the contestant may choose between the Classic and High Risk money tree. In the High Risk money tree, the second safe haven at ₱150,000 was removed, but a fourth lifeline, Double Dip, was added and could be used at any point within the game.
 In the 14th season, the questions were reduced from 15 to 12. Unlike its British counterpart, the first three questions were simply removed. The money trees were identified as Money Trees 1 and 2, where 1 is the Classic format and 2 is the High Risk format. The lifelines available were Phone-A-Friend, Switch and Double Dip. 50:50 was added as a fourth lifeline in High Risk format. Also, the three pre-arranged friends were displayed onscreen.

Lifelines
Contestants are given a set of lifelines to help them in the game. Lifelines may be used once only.
 50:50: The computer removes two random incorrect answers, leaving the correct answer and one incorrect answer.
 Phone-A-Friend (2000–2002; 2009–2012; 2015): The contestant calls one of their friends from their predetermined list. They are given 30 seconds to discuss the question.
 Ask the Audience (2000–2002; 2009–2010): The members of the audience are polled using a keypad with buttons labelled from A to D. They press the button corresponding to the answer they think is the correct one. The percentage of the answers are shown onscreen and on the monitors.
 People Speak (2011–2015): Members of the audience who think that they know the answer are instructed to stand up. The contestant selects three people to be asked for their answer. A ₱20,000 cash prize is split equally to the selected people who have answered correctly.
 Switch (2011–2015): The computer picks a new question of the same value. Any lifelines used on the original question are not reinstated. This lifeline was initially available after question 11. It was made available from the beginning of the game in the succeeding seasons as a replacement for Phone-A-Friend.
 Double Dip (2013–2015): The contestant is given two chances to answer a question. If the first answer is incorrect, they cannot walk away and must give a second answer.

The set of lifelines used per season is tabulated below.

Season overview

Main series

Specials

Who Deserves to Be a Millionaire?
For four episodes starting from December 12, 2009, to January 2, 2010, a special charity edition of the show was held called Who Deserves to Be a Millionaire?. Each episode comprised one celebrity and a representative from his/her chosen charity playing as a team. Rules stayed the same. The special charity edition returned on December 4, 2011, and lasted until December 25, 2011. Four celebrities have played for their chosen charity.

Who Wants to Be a Millionaire? Ikaw Na Yun!
On September 2013, a week before the premiere of the tenth season, a special was aired featuring the history of the show and its international variants. Past contestants were interviewed regarding their experience on the hotseat. Several clips of the show were also shown.

See also
 List of programs aired by 5 (TV channel)
 List of programs previously broadcast by Intercontinental Broadcasting Corporation

Notes

References

External links
 Who Wants to Be a Millionaire page from TV5 website

2000 Philippine television series debuts
2002 Philippine television series endings
2009 Philippine television series debuts
2015 Philippine television series endings
Intercontinental Broadcasting Corporation original programming
Philippine game shows
Philippine television series based on British television series
TV5 (Philippine TV network) original programming
Who Wants to Be a Millionaire?
Television series by Viva Television
Filipino-language television shows